Andrew Ewan Stewart (born 26 August 1957) is a Scottish film, television and stage actor.

Early life 
Stewart was born in Glasgow, and is the son of the late Scottish entertainer Andy Stewart. His mother Sheila lives in Arbroath, Scotland. Stewart was educated at Edinburgh's Clifton Hall School and Merchiston Castle School from 1966–1974. He left Scotland to move to London in 1975 and started working in theatres as well as studying drama.

Career 
Stewart's first television appearance was in an advertisement for Scottish "Bluebell" matches. His first major TV appearance was in 1979 in the TV remake of All Quiet on the Western Front, with Richard Thomas and Ernest Borgnine. In 1989, Stewart played Dr Robbie Meadows on the sitcom Only Fools and Horses.

Stewart played First Officer Murdoch in Titanic (1997). In 2005, Stewart was one of many European actors considered for the vacant role of James Bond. In 2008, Stewart starred in the film Ecstasy based on The Undefeated from Irvine Welsh's best-selling novel Ecstasy: Three Tales of Chemical Romance.

Stewart was the voice actor and motion caption actor for Shen in the video game Heavenly Sword, released in 2007.

Personal life 
Stewart lives in London with his wife, English actress Clare Byam-Shaw, and has two children.

Work

Film

Television

Other credited television roles
 Dream Baby
 Shadows on our Skin
 Soldiers Talking Cleanly
 The Quiet Days of Mrs Stafford
 Green Street Revisited
 A Woman Calling
 The Man From Dene
 Concordes last flight (Narrator)

Video game
Heavenly Sword (2007) - Master Shen

Theatre
A Month in the Country (1981) Olivier Theatre - Snobby Price
Don Juan (7 April 1981) Cottesloe Theatre - La Ramee (Don Juan's Servant)
Flying Blind (1981) Royal Court Theatre
Sergeant Musgraves Dance Major Barbara (1982) Lyttelton Theatre
In the Blue Cottesloe Theatre
As I Lay Dying (1985) Cottlesloe Theatre - Vardarmin
The Garden of England (14 November 1985) Cottlesloe Theatre
Thyestes (June 1994) Manchester Green Room, and Royal Court Theatre - As Thyestes
The Murderers (1985) Cottesloe Theatre - Tommy
A Midsummer Night's Dream - Scottish Opera
The Orphans Comedy (1986) By Chris Hannan Traverse Theatre Edinburgh
Lucy's Play (1986) Traverse Theatre Edinburgh
Racing Demon (1990) By Sir David Hare Link 2
Road Royal Court Theatre
Live Like Pigs (By John Arden) Royal Court Theatre
Sacred Heart (27 March 1999 – 24 April 1999) Royal Court (New Ambassadors Theatre) - Pat
Our Late Night (20 October 1999 – 6 November 1999) The New Ambassadors Theatre - Lewis
Green Field (April - May 2002) The Traverse Theatre Company Edinburgh
The Pillowman (February 2005) The National Theatre
 Beautiful Burnout (2009) National Theatre of Scotland and Frantic Assembly
 Much Ado About Nothing (2011) - Shakespeare's Globe - Don Pedro
 Jumpy (2011) - Royal Court Theatre - Mark
In Time o' Strife (2013) National Theatre of Scotland
Let the Right One In (2013) National Theatre of Scotland production at the Royal Court, London
Things I Know To Be True - Lyric Hammersmith (2017/2018)
Wickies: The Vanishing Men of Eilean Mor - Park Theatre, Finsbury Park, London (2 December 2022- ongoing)

References

External links
 

1957 births
Living people
People educated at Clifton Hall School
People educated at Merchiston Castle School
Scottish male film actors
Scottish male stage actors
Scottish male television actors
Male actors from Glasgow